Reid Boucher (born September 8, 1993) is an American professional ice hockey player. He is currently playing with Avangard Omsk in the Kontinental Hockey League (KHL). Boucher has previously played in the National Hockey League (NHL) for the New Jersey Devils, Nashville Predators and Vancouver Canucks after being selected by the Devils in the fourth round (99th overall) in the 2011 NHL Entry Draft.

Playing career
As a youth, Boucher played in the 2006 Quebec International Pee-Wee Hockey Tournament with the Detroit Compuware minor ice hockey team.

Junior
In his second season with the Sarnia Sting of the Ontario Hockey League, Boucher broke the former 58 goals in a season record in the team held by NHL player Steven Stamkos with his fifth hat trick in the season against Saginaw Spirit. Boucher was rewarded for his outstanding play during the 2012–13 OHL season by being named to the OHL's First All-Star Team.

Professional

New Jersey Devils
On March 13, 2013, the New Jersey Devils signed Boucher to a three-year entry-level contract. Reid scored one goal and had two assists in his first game with Albany in the 2012–13 season debut on March 30, 2013.

On December 4, 2013, Boucher was promoted to the Devils for the first time, following an injury to Ryan Carter. He got an assist and was plus 2 in his debut and became the first Devil to score in a shootout that season. Boucher scored his first NHL goal on December 18, 2013, against Robin Lehner of the Ottawa Senators in a 5–2 win.

In the 2016–17 season, having made the Devils opening season roster, Boucher was unable to make an impact in a depth role, appearing in just 9 games over the opening months of the season with the Devils.

Nashville Predators
On December 3, 2016, Boucher's 6-year tenure with the Devils ended as he was claimed off waivers by the Nashville Predators. He made his debut with Nashville the following day against the Philadelphia Flyers before he was sent on an conditioning assigned to affiliate, the Milwaukee Admirals on December 12, 2016.

Vancouver Canucks
On January 1, 2017, Boucher was placed on waivers by the Predators. The following day, he was reclaimed by the Devils, but was again waived on January 3. On January 4, 2017, Boucher was claimed by the Vancouver Canucks. Boucher was scratched in all but one of the Canucks' games in January before drawing into the roster. He scored his first goal with Vancouver on February 28 against the Detroit Red Wings, scoring a late game-tying goal before the Canucks lost 3–2 in overtime. On March 25, he recorded his first multi-goal game; scoring twice in a 4–2 victory over the Minnesota Wild.

On July 24, 2017, the Canucks re-signed Boucher to a one-year, one-way contract worth $687,500, avoiding arbitration.

Avangard Omsk
After four seasons within the Canucks organization and failing to appear in the NHL during the 2019–20 season, Boucher as an impending free agent opted to pursue a career abroad by agreeing to an initial one-year contract with Russian club, Avangard Omsk of the KHL, on June 23, 2020. In the 2020–21 season, Boucher quickly established himself as an instrumental part of the offence, contributing with 24 goals and 24 assists for 48 points in just 51 regular season games to lead the club in scoring. He contributed with 17 points through 21 playoff contests, helping Avangard claim the Gagarin Cup for the first time in franchise history.

Lokomotiv Yaroslavl
On June 11, 2021, Boucher was traded by Avangard to Lokomotiv Yaroslavl in exchange for financial compensation. He was then signed to a two-year contract extension with Lokomotiv. Boucher completed the regular season with Lokomotiv, compiling 12 goals and 27 points through 46 games. Before appearing in the playoffs, his contract was terminated by the team on January 23, 2022 .

Return to Avangard
As a free agent moving into the off-season following his release from Lokomotiv, Boucher agreed to return to former KHL club, Avangard Omsk, signing a one-year contract on June 18, 2022.

Sexual assault
In January 2022, Boucher pleaded guilty to "sexually assaulting a minor" in 2011; the girl he assaulted was 12 at the time and he was 17.

Career statistics

Regular season and playoffs

International

Awards and honours

References

External links

1993 births
Living people
Albany Devils players
American men's ice hockey left wingers
Avangard Omsk players
Lokomotiv Yaroslavl players
Ice hockey players from Michigan
People from Grand Ledge, Michigan
Milwaukee Admirals players
Nashville Predators players
New Jersey Devils draft picks
New Jersey Devils players
Sarnia Sting players
USA Hockey National Team Development Program players
Utica Comets players
Vancouver Canucks players